Manfred Aschner (21 May 1901 – 1989) was an Israeli microbiologist and entomologist.

Biography 
Aschner was born in Germany in 1901. He emigrated to Mandate Palestine (now Israel) in 1924 and joined in the efforts to eradicate malaria from the country.

Awards 
 In 1956, Aschner was awarded the Israel Prize, for the life sciences.

References

See also 
List of Israel Prize recipients
Aschner

1901 births
1989 deaths
Israel Prize in life sciences recipients who were biologists
German emigrants to Mandatory Palestine
20th-century German Jews
Israeli entomologists
Israeli microbiologists
20th-century Israeli zoologists